Gillot Saint-Evre (1791 in Boult-sur-Suippe – 1858 in Paris) was a French painter and engraver. He created scenes on historical and literary subjects, as well as genre scenes and portraits.

Life and work 
His creative career began in the 1820s and first attracted attention at the Paris Salon in 1822, where he displayed two paintings depicting scenes from The Tempest by Shakespeare. A young journalist named Adolphe Thiers (who would later become the President of France) wrote a positive review of the exhibit and called him a painter of great promise. This inspired him to create more works on literary themes.

Among these works are lithographs showing Louis XI with Countess Isabelle de Croye, from Quentin Durward by Sir Walter Scott, and scenes from Henry III and His Court, an early play by Alexandre Dumas. The failure of a series of works on Don Quixote forced him to do a critical reevaluation of his work.

He decided to abandon literature in favor of history. Although he focused on events from Medieval France, he continued to paint in the prevailing Romantic and Sentimentalist style. He premiered his new specialty at the Salon of 1833, with a scene depicting Joan of Arc being presented to King Charles VII in 1429; currently at the Мusée National in the Palace of Versailles. This was the first of a series of paintings on her life.

Generally, critics now consider the history paintings to be inferior to his portraits. A good example of the latter are his joint portraits of the architect, Joseph-Jacques Ramée and his wife, Caroline.

Interest in his work gradually declined and he was forgotten, until 2016, when "Miranda Playing Chess with Ferdinand" was auctioned at a modest price and acquired by the Musée de la Vie Romantique.

References

Further reading 
 Charles Gabet. Dictionnaire des artistes de l'école française au XIXe siècle. Paris. 1831. P. 620.
 François Fortuné Guyot de Frère. Annuaire des artistes français. Paris. 1832. P. 81.
 Les Salons retrouvés. Eclats de la vie artistique dans la France du Nord 1815—1848. II. Répertoire des artistes ayant exposé dans les salons du Nord de la France (1815—1848). Exhibition catalog, Calais-Dunkerque-Douai, 1993. P. 158.

External links

 Works by Saint-Evre @ the Base Joconde

1791 births
1858 deaths
19th-century French painters
French history painters
French portrait painters